The École Supérieure d'Audiovisuel (ESAV - Graduate School of Audiovisual) is an educational institute in Toulouse that teaches aspects of filmmaking.
It was created in 1978 under the leadership of the University of Toulouse-Le Mirail and Guy Chapouillié. It issues Level 3 license, Master 1 and Master 2 certificates. 
The Master 2 leads eventually to a PhD course.

The school has a library created in 1989 that holds more than 10,000 documents, mainly books and movies in the audiovisual field.
It preserves and promotes the works of students of the school.

Notable graduates
Pierre Rigal, dancer and choreographer.
Laurent Salgues, director of Rêves de poussière (2007).

References

Film schools in France
Education in Toulouse
Educational institutions established in 1978
Mass media in Toulouse
1978 establishments in France